Thrower is a surname. Notable people with the surname include:

Debbie Thrower (born 1957), British television presenter
Edd Thrower (born 1982), English rugby union footballer
Francis Thrower Fairey (1887–1971), Canadian politician, member of the Canadian House of Commons
James Thrower (1936–1999), British academic and writer
Norma Thrower (born 1936), retired Australian hurdler
Percy Thrower MBE (1913–1988), British gardener, horticulturist, broadcaster and writer
Peter Thrower (born 1938), professor emeritus of materials science and engineering at Pennsylvania State University
Randolph W. Thrower (1913–2014), IRS commissioner under Nixon
Stephen Thrower (born 1963), English musician and author
Thomas Thrower (1870–1917), Australian politician
Willie Thrower (1930–2002), American football quarterback

See also
Bolt Thrower, British death metal band from Coventry, England
Hat thrower (Pilobolus crystallinus var. crystallinus), species of fungus in the Mucorales order
Mammoth spear thrower, spear thrower in the form of a mammoth, discovered at the rock shelter of Montastruc, Tarn-et-Garonne, France
Rocket Thrower, bronze sculpture located in Flushing Meadows-Corona Park in Queens New York City
The Knife Thrower and Other Stories by Steven Millhauser, first published in 1998 by Crown Publishers, Inc., New York
"The Star Thrower", part of a 16-page essay of the same name by Loren Eiseley (1907–1977)